Lampros Politis (born 12 December 1995) is a Greek professional footballer who plays as an attacking midfielder for Super League 2 club Chania.

References

1995 births
Living people
Greek footballers
Apollon Smyrnis F.C. players
Iraklis Psachna F.C. players
Association football midfielders
Footballers from Chalcis